Donna Stifler (born February 24, 1965) was elected to the Maryland House of Delegates, representing District 35A, Harford County in 2006 after defeating incumbent Joanne Parrott.

Education
Stifler attend Bel Air High School.  She earned her B.S. from North Carolina State University in 1987.

Career
After college, Stifler was a pharmaceutical sales representative and also a fifth grade teacher.  She is the founder and director of the Bel Air High School Foundation.

She is a member of several organizations including Harford Habitat for Humanity, Harford County Republican Women, the Republican Club of Harford County and the Harford County Chamber of Commerce.

Legislative Notes
 voted against in-state tuition for illegal immigrants in 2007 (HB6)
voted against the Clean Indoor Air Act of 2007 (HB359)

Election results 
2006 Race for Maryland House of Delegates – District 35A
Voters to choose two:
{| class="wikitable"
|-
!Name
!Votes
!Percent
!Outcome
|-
|- 
|Barry Glassman, Rep.
|21,766
|  40.1%
|   Won
|-
|-
|Donna Stifler, Rep.
|18,909
|  34.8%
|   Won
|-
|-
|Craig H. DeRan, Dem.
|13,589
|  25.0%
|   Lost
|-
|Other Write-Ins 
|81
|  0.1%
|   
|-
|}

References and notes

External links
https://web.archive.org/web/20100523161111/http://www.donnastifler.com/
http://www.msa.md.gov/msa/mdmanual/06hse/html/msa14633.html

People from Bel Air, Maryland
1965 births
Republican Party members of the Maryland House of Delegates
Living people
Women state legislators in Maryland
North Carolina State University alumni
21st-century American politicians
21st-century American women politicians